The Pretty Sister of Jose was a 1915 American silent romantic drama written and directed by Allan Dwan, and distributed by Paramount Pictures. Based on Frances Hodgson Burnett's 1889 novel of the same name and the 1903 stage play starring Maude Adams, the film starred Marguerite Clark and Jack Pickford. The Pretty Sister of Jose is now presumed lost.

Cast
 Marguerite Clark - Pepita
 Jack Pickford - Jose
 Edythe Chapman - Their Mother
Gertrude Norman - Their Grandmother
William Lloyd - The Padre
Rupert Julian - Sebastiano
Teddy Sampson - Sarita
Dick Rosson - Manuel

See also
List of lost films

References

External links
 

1915 films
1915 romantic drama films
American romantic drama films
American silent feature films
American black-and-white films
Films directed by Allan Dwan
Films based on American novels
Films based on British novels
American films based on plays
Films based on works by Frances Hodgson Burnett
Lost American films
Paramount Pictures films
Films based on adaptations
1915 lost films
Lost romantic drama films
1910s American films
Silent romantic drama films
Silent American drama films
1910s English-language films